North of Nome may refer to:

 North of Nome (1925 film), a silent American film
 North of Nome (1936 film), an American sound film